Hello Dolly! is a jazz album by Louis Armstrong and His All Stars, which at the time included Joe Darensbourg, Billy Kyle, Big Chief Russell Moore, Arvell Shaw, Danny Barcelona and Trummy Young. The tracks were mostly recorded on December 3, 1963, and April 18, 1964, in New York City. It was released by Kapp Records in 1964 and became Armstrong's most commercially successful album.

Track listing
  Louis Armstrong : Hello, Dolly! (Kapp Records – KS-3364, MCA (Jap) 8146, MCA-Coral (G) COPS1780, 42013, Coral (E) CPS73, Mode (F) MDINT9692, MCA MCA-538 [CD])

Reception
Greg Adams gave the album 3½ out of 5 stars in Allmusic and said, "Armstrong had one of the most recognizable and personality-laden voices of the 20th century, and although he was past his prime at the time, "Hello, Dolly!" shows him at his '60s best."

Digby Fairweather included the album in the selected Armstrong discography in The Rough Guide to Jazz, saying that "Armstrong has established himself in 1964 with a new generation of fans."

References

1964 albums
Louis Armstrong albums
Kapp Records albums